The 1985–86 Virginia Tech Hokies men's basketball team represented Virginia Polytechnic Institute and State University from Blacksburg, Virginia as members of the Metro Conference during the 1985–86 season. The Hokies were led by head coach Charles Moir and played their home games at Cassell Coliseum in Blacksburg, Virginia. After finishing third in the Metro regular season standings, Virginia Tech was knocked off in the quarterfinals of the conference tournament. The Hokies still secured an at-large bid to the NCAA tournament. As No. 7 seed in the Southeast region, the team was beaten by No. 10 seed and defending National champion Villanova in the opening round.

Senior guard Dell Curry ended his career with school records for points in a single season and career, both of which have been surpassed. Curry remains the school record holder for career steals. Curry was taken by the Utah Jazz with the 15th pick of the 1986 NBA draft. Though he only played one season in Utah, Curry would go on to have a 16-year career in the NBA.

Roster

Schedule and results

|-
!colspan=9 style=| Regular Season

|-
!colspan=9 style=| Metro Tournament

|-
!colspan=9 style=| NCAA Tournament

Rankings

Players in the 1986 NBA Draft

References

Virginia Tech Hokies men's basketball seasons
Virginia Tech
Virginia Tech
1985 in sports in Virginia
1986 in sports in Virginia